Kalu Maira is a village in the Khyber Pakhtunkhwa Province of Pakistan. It is located at 34°3'0N 73°6'0E with an altitude of 840 metres (2759 feet).

References

Villages in Khyber Pakhtunkhwa